Spud or Spuds is a nickname for:

Spud
 Simon Beggs, former guitarist in the American rock hybrid band Mondo Generator
 Jim Bolger (born 1935), former Prime Minister of New Zealand
 Mark Carroll (rugby league) (born 1967), Australian rugby league player
 Spud Chandler (1907–1990), American baseball player
 Spud Clements (born 1928), American politician
 Spud Davis (1904-1984), American Major League Baseball catcher, coach, scout and manager
 George Raymond Eisele (1923–1942), United States Navy sailor killed in World War II
 Michael Firrito (born 1983), Australian rules footballer
 Danny Frawley (born 1963), former Australian rules footballer and coach
 Spud Johnson (1856-?), American Major League Baseball player
 Howie Krist (1916-1989), American Major League Baseball pitcher
 John McConnell (actor) (born 1958), American actor and radio personality
 Arthur Melin, co-founder of the Wham-O toy company and co-inventor of the modern hula hoop
 Sadao Munemori (1922–1945), United States Army soldier posthumously awarded the Medal of Honor
 Arthur William Murphy (1891-1963), Royal Australian Air Force aviator and temporary air commodore
 Peter Murphy (footballer, born 1922) (1922-1975), English footballer
 Peter Dutton (born 1970), Australian politician
 Spud Owen, head football coach for the Eureka College Red Devils (1953-1955)
 Spud Webb (born 1963), American basketball player

Spuds
 Theodore G. Ellyson (1885-1928), first United States Navy aviator
 Andy Hebenton (born 1929), Canadian National Hockey League player

Lists of people by nickname